is a series of CGI anime shorts produced by Jinni's Animation Studios and Walt Disney Television International Japan. The designer is Hitoshi Fukuchi. It is animated entirely in 3D with no cel-shading of any sort, as would be typical for the medium.

The show takes place in the distant future of the 47th millennium, and revolves around the happenings inside a giant manor inhabited by two robots; the gynoid duchess Drossel von Flügel (voiced by Miyuki Kawashō) and her massive cyclopian arachnoid servant, Gedächtnis (Toru Okawa). The episodes are usually nonsensical in nature, normally showing the two characters making idle conversation in the midst of a war with humanity. A third character, a monkey-like robot named "Schadenfreude", joins them during the course of the series.

Synopsis
The series' main characters, Gedächtnis and Drossel von Flügel, reside in a gigantic manor surrounded by a presumably robot-inhabited city, beyond which is a desert that humanity's forces slowly encroach across during the 144-year timeframe in which the series is set (identified onscreen as the "Merkur Era", 48,650–48,794).

Gedächtnis is Drossel's servant and guardian, having sworn to her late father to protect her. Drossel treats him very much after the manner of the "spoiled princess" stereotype. A running gag in the series is that, at the beginning, Gedächtnis waits for Drossel to arrive and is called by a name Drossel chooses seemingly at random (although some, such as Sancho Panza and Rasputin, infer an unambiguously subservient status upon him). Gedächtnis then attempts (in a gentle, butler-like fashion) to remind Drossel of his name, upon which she tells him not to interrupt her. Another recurring joke is Drossel claiming that she practices karate despite her moves obviously being capoeira.

Drossel was manufactured as having the mind of a 14-year-old girl, with Gedächtnis' being that of a 50-year-old man; neither's age is explicitly stated, although both are known to be at least 2,800 years old–Gedächtnis stated that he entered service with the von Flugel family 2,800 years ago, and that it has been his duty to remain by Drossel's side for all of that time. Both Gedächtnis and Drossel move and speak in markedly unconventional ways, for example: instantly replying to each other at inhumanly fast speeds; freezing in postures until a new one is assumed; replying in seemingly unrelated ways. They remark upon how illogical human speech seems to them and act in what could be said to be an unemotional manner, though they do show emotions at times.

The characters occasionally display knowledge of elements that would normally be considered on the other side of the fourth wall–Drossel makes reference to what happened "in the last episode", and at another time points out that she has heard something already in an anime; Gedächtnis stops a laughter track (and indeed, the episode) by punching the screen, causing it to fracture in the accustomed glass-splinter visual code and then to fall sideways to the floor.

The series sometimes makes serious points in otherwise complete nonsense–the city in which Tempest Tower is built (shown during the opening title sequence) appears to be stereotypically dystopian in appearance; in the episode "Butterfly", Gedächtnis discusses the nature of rules, and what it is to be 'real' in an almost philosophical fashion, and the last episode features some distinctive "last stand" elements (it is this episode in which Drossel recites her entire name and title and then walks to face the human forces just as the series ends).

Crew
 Series Director: Wataru Arakawa (Walt Disney Animation (Japan), Inc. and Walt Disney Television International Japan)
 Series Composition: Hidemi Akao, Hitoshi Uehara, Mayumi Kawanishi and Nobumasa Hoshino
 Character Design: Hitoshi Fukuchi and Takayuki Yanase
 CG Director/Producer: Shigeyuki Watanabe (Walt Disney Animation (Japan), Inc. and Walt Disney Television International Japan), Hiroki Kawashima
 Guest Design: Asato Mifune (Walt Disney Animation (Japan), Inc. and Walt Disney Television International Japan) and Rie Tanaka
 Producers: Shogo Fukuwara, Nobumasa Hoshino (Jinni's Animation Studios), Hironori Motooka, Animation Production by Walt Disney Animation (Japan), Inc. and Walt Disney Television International Japan and co-produced by (Produced in association of Disney Channel Japan).

Production
The anime series was created by Jinni's Animation Studios and animation production by Walt Disney Animation (Japan), Inc. and Walt Disney Television International Japan (conjunction of Walt Disney Animation Studios) and produced in association of Disney Channel.

Sequels
On August 10, 2010, it was announced on the official Fireball blog that the production for a second series had been green-lit, with director and writer Wataru Arakawa on board.

The sequel, titled Fireball Charming, was released in 2011 and is set chronologically before the events of Fireball (Fireball is set between the years 48650–48734; Charming begins in 48234, as shown on each episode's title cards). In all seasons save Fireball Humorous, either 8 or 16 years lapse between episodes.

Another sequel, Fireball Humorous, was released in 2017. There are no title cards showing the year, but a set of novelty glasses spelling out "40000" appear in episode 3, indicating that it most likely takes place later than that year.

The final chapter Fireball Gebäude Bäude was released in 2020; it is set between 39298 and 39362 in the "Cinnabar Calendar".

Series overview

Episodes list

Fireball

Fireball Special

Fireball Charming

Fireball Humorous

References

External links
Official website
Official website of anime Walt Disney Animation (Japan), Inc. and Walt Disney Television International Japan second television series Fireball, produced in assiciation of Disney Channel Japan — Alternative link

2008 anime television series debuts
2011 anime television series debuts
2017 anime television series debuts
2020 anime television series debuts
Disney Channels Worldwide original programming
2008 Japanese television series debuts
2008 Japanese television series endings
2011 Japanese television series debuts
2011 Japanese television series endings
Animated television series about robots
Disney animated television series
Television series set in the future
Television series by Disney
Disney Media Networks franchises
TMS Entertainment
Anime series
Japanese-language Disney Channel original programming